"Oh Baby I..." is a song by English girl group Eternal, written by Lotti Golden and Tommy Faragher. It was the fifth single released from their debut album, Always & Forever (1993). The song entered the UK Singles Chart at number seven on 30 October 1994, climbing to its peak of number four a week later. The single spent 10 weeks in the top 40, which up to this point was their longest chart run, and was certified Silver by the BPI on 1 January 1995 for shipments over 200,000. The song also reached the top 10 in the Netherlands and narrowly missed the top 10 in Ireland and New Zealand, charting at number 11 in both countries.

Critical reception
Jon O'Brien from AllMusic viewed the song as an example of "perfect R&B-infused pop". Annette M. Lai from the Gavin Report described it as "touching". James Masterton wrote, "Now with their fifth single they move away from the dancefloor and into ballad territory". Alan Jones from Music Week rated "Oh Baby I..." four out of five, picking it as Pick of the Week. He declared it as "a sophisticated and pretty ballad that proves they have the vocal ability to hold their own against Jade and SWV. A nicely restrained production that should have no trouble in maintaining their hot streak, while luring new fans to the Always & Forever album." Mark Frith from Smash Hits complimented it as a "lush ballad".

Music video
A music video was produced to promote the single, directed by British editor Tim Royes.

Track listings

 UK 7-inch and cassette single
 "Oh Baby I..." (Nigel Lowis remix)
 "Sweet Funky Thing" (New York City radio mix)
 "Oh Baby I..." (original mix)

 UK and Australian CD single
 "Oh Baby I..." (Nigel Lowis remix)
 "Sweet Funky Thing" (Puff the Blunted Dragon mix)
 "Sweet Funky Thing" (K & T Atlanta remix)
 "Decisions"

 European maxi-CD single
 "Oh Baby I..." (Nigel Lowis remix)
 "(Something Inside) So Strong"
 "Sweet Funky Thing" (West End Master mix)
 "Sweet Funky Thing" (K & T Southern remix)

Credits and personnel
Credits are lifted from the Always & Forever album booklet.

Studios
 Recorded at Mad Fly Productions (New York City)
 Mixed at Platinum Island (New York City)

Personnel
 Tommy Faragher – writing, keyboards, drums, production, mixing, engineering
 Lotti Golden – writing, production, mixing
 Paul Pesco – guitar, sitar
 Bashiri Johnson – percussion
 David Sussman – mix engineering, mixing

Charts

Weekly charts

Year-end charts

Certifications

References

1990s ballads
1993 songs
1994 singles
Contemporary R&B ballads
EMI Records singles
Eternal (band) songs
First Avenue Records singles
Pop ballads
Songs written by Lotti Golden
Songs written by Tommy Faragher